Thamizhum Saraswathiyum is an Indian Tamil-language soap opera starring Deepak Dinkar and Nakshatra Nagesh. It started airing from 12 July 2021 on Star Vijay and streams on Disney+ Hotstar.

Plot 
The chapter starts with Tamizharasu, commonly known as Tamil, a tenth-grade dropout who deserted his studies due to his family's financial hardship. His family consists of seven members: his mother and father, Kothai and Natarajan, who originally established Kothai Industries, which is now managed by Tamil, and his younger brother, Karthik, who has fulfilled an MBA, and his sister, Ragini, who is studying MBBS, Abitha, who appears to work as a maid in their house and is taken into account a part of their family as well as an orphan by Kothai, and Tamil's friend Namachivayam, who lives in Kothai's house. Kothai has an older brother whose daughter intended to marry Tamil but subsequently withdrew according to his studies, provoking Kothai to dare her to find another husband. 
On the other hand, it focuses on Saraswati's family, whereby her father Chokkalingam serves as a school administrator and detests Saraswati because she's been studying grade 12 for almost 10 years. Saraswathi's mother, Vasuki, is an educator who attempts to make her feel better. Saraswati's paternal grandmother, who periodically supports her, nor her younger sister Kavya, who also is continuing her B.Tech. in a university, try to teach Saraswati, but she doesn't understand. Her brother Arun, who has also been pursuing his B.Tech. in AI (Artificial Science), absolutely hates Saraswati's studies.
After the event of the turned-down wedding proposal, a demotivated Tamil prays to God, where Saraswati visits and plays a sarcastic comment on him, telling him that he will meet a girl three to four times in the rain and marry her. After this, a happy Tamil tells this to Namachivayam, who really doesn't believe him, and those who return to the temple, where they meet, and it begins to rain.

The storyline then moves on to Chandrakala, another former sub-collector. She is also Vasundhara, Aditya's mother. Vasundhara is smitten with Karthik, Thamizh's younger brother. Love is something Kodhai despises. To Thamizh, Karthik professes his love for Vasundhara. Eventually after a lot of problems, the family agrees and Karthik and Vasundhara marry. Meanwhile, one boy attempted to throw a paper at Saraswathi, she gets in trouble cheating on an exam. Chokkalingam (Saraswathi's father) gets enraged by this. Saraswathi comes to terms with her feelings for Tamizh. Kodhai arranges for Thamizh to marry Suhasini. Thamizh realizes his love for Saraswathi on the day of their engagement. Is he planning to marry Saraswathi or Suhasini?

Suhasini states she doesn't want to marry Tamizh because of his education level a few days later. One day, Saraswathi finds Kodhai by chance and saves her as she passes out. Saraswathi begins to appeal to Kodhai. Thamizh confesses his love for Saraswathi to Chokkalingam one day, and the latter agrees to see the clan. She continues to like Kodhai and when he starts asking questions about her qualifications, Saraswathi lies and reveals she took MBA to marry Thamizh. Kodhai agrees to marry Thamizh and Saraswathi despite Saraswathi's lack of education. Chandrakala and Geetha are continually attempting to prevent Thamizh and Saraswathi from marrying. Thamizh's aunt, Geetha, despises Kodhai's family and frequently participates with Chandrakala in her schemes. Geetha discovers Saraswathi's educational level one day, but she is rendered speechless due to an accident. When Geetha escapes from the hospital and she and Chandrakala reveal the truth about Saraswathi's education, The euphoria of Thamizh and Saraswathi is fleeting. As a result of Kodhai's passing out from shock, the entire family turns against Thamizh. Kodhai passes out from shock, and the entire family turns both against Thamizh and Saraswathi as a result. Saraswathi now plans to complete Grade 12 and pursue an MBA to prove herself and gain legitimacy from her family.  

When Kothai returned home following her heart attack. She invites Saraswathi and Tamil inside the house. Vasundhara at the time supported both, although Karthi opposed them. Saraswathi was given the directive to avoid speaking negatively about her parents. She also gets ready for the 12th-grade exam so she can demonstrate her point in full. Geetha and Chandrakala are attempting to split while making various trap plans.
While Kothai and Natesan sent Thamil& Saraswathi and Karthik& Vasundhara for a honeymoon to experience and comprehend themselves in Yercaud, Vasundhara and Karthik haven't yet begun living their marital life. Then they come back and are united once more. Vasundhara also becomes pregnant, and Chandrakala throws a party for everyone to enjoy.

Thamizh and Saraswathi are split apart by Chandrakala and Madhu. The marriage between Thamizh and Saraswathi starts to fall apart. After being encircled by thugs, Madhu calls Thamizh for assistance. She is saved by inebriated Thamizh. Madhu later claims to be expecting Thamizh's child. When Kodhai's family learns of this, they have 24 hours to establish Thamizh's innocence. Evidence that Madhu lied about her pregnancy is provided to Saraswathi. Ragini, a sister of Thamizh, develops feelings for Aadhi, a brother of Vasundhara. He rejects Ragini's proposal when she makes it. Arjun, a colleague of Karthik saves Ragini when she is sad. As Arjun and Ragini get closer, they begin to fall in love. Even though Arjun only married Ragini to exact revenge on Kodhai's family, they eventually got married. As Saraswathi begins to question Arjun's evil intentions.

Cast

Main 
 Deepak Dinkar as Thamizharasan Natesan: Saraswathi's husband (2021–present); Kothai and Natesan's elder son, A very responsible and respectable guy who stopped his education and took over the family business at an incredibly youthful age due to circumstances.
 Nakshatra Nagesh as Saraswathi Thamizharasu: Thamizh's wife (2021–present); Chokkalingam and Vasuki's elder daughter and Kothai and Natesan's eldest daughter-in-law. She is a bubbly enthusiastic girl who wants to be happy in her life. But she has always been looked down upon for not being able to complete her promised M.B.A. degree.

Supporting 
 Rekha Krishnappa as Chandrakala Devi: Vasundhara and Aditya's mother (Main Antagonist).
 Meera Krishna as Kothainayagi Natesan: Natesan's wife; Thamizh, Karthik and Raagini's mother.
 Ramachandran Mahalingam as Natesaperumal: Kodhai's husband; Thamizh, Karthik and Raagini's father.
 Navin Vetri as Karthikeyan Natesan: Kodhai and Natesan's younger son; Thamizh's younger brother and Vasundhara's husband.
 Dharshna Sripal Golecha as Vasundhra Devi : Karthik's wife and Chandrakala's daughter.
 Rayan as Arjun: Raagini's husband. (Antagonist) 
 Lavanya Manickam / Asritha Sreedas as Raagini : Kodhai and Natesan's daughter; Thamizh and Karthik's younger sister 
 Saif as Adithya: Chandrakala's son and Vasundhara's elder brother.
 KPY Yogi as Namachivayam: Thamizh's best friend.
 Kayal Vizhi as Abitha: Kothai's housemaid.
 Ganesh as Manickam: Kothai's elder brother.
 Mercy Leyal as Geetha Manickam: Tamizh's Aunt
 Madhumikha Srinivas / Sailu Imran as Madhumita: Geetha's daughter and Thamizh's cousin.
 Prabhakaran Chandran as Chokkalingam: Saraswathi's father.
 Anitha Venkat as Vasuki Chokkalingam: Saraswathi's mother.
 A. Revathy as Meenakshi: Saraswathi's grandmother.
 Madhan Pandian as Arunprasad Chokkalingam: Saraswathi's brother.
 Sangeetha / Kokila Gopal as Kavyapriya Chokkalingam: Saraswathi's sister.
 Babitha as Arjun's mother
 Swathika Senthilkumar as Jayanthi: Arjun’s sister
 Pop suresh as Parumal: Jayanthi’s husband and Arjun’s brother in law 
 Uma Maheswari as Minnal: Saraswathi's friend.
 Radhika Menon as Minnal's mother.
 Yamini Saravanan as Raagini's friend.
 Shalini as Nisha: Arjun's fiancé

Cameo
 Sushma Nair as Suhasini Gunasekaran (2021)
 VJ Thara as Lavanya Gunasekaran (2021)
 Devi Teju as Lakshmi Gunasekaran (2021)
 Reshma as Arjun's elder sister (photographic appearance) (2022)
 Venkat as Arjun's father (photographic appearance) (2022)

Crossovers and special episodes
 It had a crossover with Pandian Stores from 15 November to 28 November 2021.

Production

Development 
This is Vikatan Televistas show, which was supposed to premiere in May 2021 but was postponed due to lock down while shootings were halted owing to COVID-19 pandemic in India. The first promo was released on 24 June 2021. Deepak Dinkar who commonly joined with S.Kumaran's projects such as Thendral and Thirumathi Selvam where reprising his role and making his come back

Reception
This show has delivered decent ratings since its launch week.

References

External links 

Star Vijay original programming
Tamil-language television soap operas
2021 Tamil-language television series debuts
Television shows set in Tamil Nadu
Tamil-language melodrama television series